John Buchanan (1 January 1884 in Rhu – 25 November 1943 in Rhu) was a Scottish sailor who competed for the Royal Clyde Yacht Club in the 1908 Summer Olympics.

He was a crew member of the Scottish boat Hera, which won the gold medal in the 12-metre class.

References

External links 
 
 
 

1884 births
1943 deaths
People from Rhu, Argyll and Bute
Scottish male sailors (sport)
Sailors at the 1908 Summer Olympics – 12 Metre
Olympic sailors of Great Britain
British male sailors (sport)
Olympic gold medallists for Great Britain
Olympic medalists in sailing
Scottish Olympic medallists
Medalists at the 1908 Summer Olympics